Thelymitra venosa, commonly known as the large veined sun orchid, is a species of orchid that is endemic to New South Wales. It has a single fleshy, channelled leaf and up to six relatively large, bright-blue flowers with darker veins. The arms on the side of the column are twisted and yellow, but not toothed at the tip. Unlike most other thelymitras, the flowers do not usually close on cloudy days.

Description
The labellum (the lowest petal) is larger than the other petals and sepals. The lobe on the top of the anther is short with a few glands. The side arms on the column are yellow and twisted. Unlike most other sun orchids, the flowers do not usually close in cloudy weather and sometimes remain open at night. Flowering occurs from October to January.

Taxonomy and naming
Thelymitra venosa was first formally described in 1810 by Robert Brown and the description was published in Prodromus Florae Novae Hollandiae et Insulae Van Diemen. The specific epithet (venosa) is derived from a Latin word meaning "veiny".

Distribution and habitat
The large veined sun orchid grows with low shrubs, sedges, and mosses on sandstone rock ledges in the Blue Mountains and nearby coastal areas.

References

External links
 

venosa
Endemic orchids of Australia
Orchids of New South Wales
Plants described in 1810